Ghazemabad may refer to:
 Ghazemabad, Saveh
 Ghazemabad, Nowbaran